Frederick Mearns (31 March 1879 – 22 January 1931) was an English footballer who played for Hartlepool United and Barnsley as a goalkeeper. During his time with Barnsley, he was an FA Cup finalist in 1910. Mearns later worked as a trainer for Durham City.

Club career
He played for Bradford City between June 1904 (after joining from Tottenham Hotspur) and May 1906 (when he signed for Bury). He made 21 league and 2 FA Cup appearances for the club.

Mearns joined Hartlepool United in 1908 for their inaugural season in the North Eastern League where they came fourth. In the summer of 1909 he joined Barnsley. He played in the Barnsley side who reached the FA Cup in 1910.

Sources

References

1879 births
1931 deaths
Footballers from Sunderland
Association football goalkeepers
English footballers
Barnsley F.C. players
Hartlepool United F.C. players
Grays Athletic F.C. players
Sunderland A.F.C. players
Kettering Town F.C. players
Tottenham Hotspur F.C. players
Bradford City A.F.C. players
Southern United F.C. players
Barrow A.F.C. players
Bury F.C. players
Stockton F.C. players
Leicester City F.C. players
Newcastle United F.C. players
English Football League players
Sunderland West End F.C. players
FA Cup Final players